The gens Mallia was a plebeian family at ancient Rome.  Due to its relative obscurity, the nomen Mallius is frequently, but erroneously amended to the more common Manlius.  The only member of this gens to obtain any of the higher curule magistracies under the Republic was Gnaeus Mallius Maximus, consul in 105 BC.

See also
 List of Roman gentes

References

Bibliography
 Marcus Tullius Cicero, In Catilinam, De Oratore.
 Gaius Sallustius Crispus (Sallust), Bellum Catilinae (The Conspiracy of Catiline), Bellum Jugurthinum (The Jugurthine War).
 Titus Livius (Livy), Ab Urbe Condita (History of Rome).
 Lucius Cassius Dio Cocceianus (Cassius Dio), Roman History.
 Dictionary of Greek and Roman Biography and Mythology, William Smith, ed., Little, Brown and Company, Boston (1849).
 T. Robert S. Broughton, The Magistrates of the Roman Republic, American Philological Association (1952).

 
Roman gentes